1940 Carmen is the eighth studio album by Chilean singer Mon Laferte, released on October 29, 2021, through Universal Music México. It was produced by Laferte herself and includes songs both in Spanish and English. 

The album was conceived during Laferte's pregnancy and was composed in Los Angeles, United States at an Airbnb where she lived at the time, the name of the album is the address of the apartment where she lived while the cover art is a close-up selfie taken by Laferte in front of a mirror. It received a nomination for Best Latin Rock or Alternative Album at the 65th Annual Grammy Awards, becoming Laferte's second nomination in the ceremony.

Background
Following the release of "Algo es Mejor" in October 2021, the first single of the album, Laferte announced 1940 Carmen as her next project set to be released later in the year, the album was released on October 29, 2021, being her second studio album released on 2021 after SEIS, released on April. From March 2021 to July of the same year, Laferte lived at an Airbnb in Los Angeles, United States, where she learnt she was pregnant and recorded the album.
 
Laferte had been trying to get pregnant for a year and found out that when she'd undergone radiation for thyroid cancer in 2009, her ovaries had been affected, she started taking hormones as part of her fertility treatment which impacted on her songwriting for the album. Laferte said that "it was a daily shot of hormones and I was very sensitive. everything I've written or done doesn't really have much of a plan, it was explosive of me to want to make a record".

Composition
The album was composed and produced by Laferte herself during the four months she lived in Los Angeles and was influenced by the treatment she was going through in order to get pregnant. It features a more minimalistic sound compared to her previous album, the Mexican music-inspired SEIS, and has more introspective and intimate lyrics, the instrumentation is also more acoustic that her previous projects with the guitar as the main instrument for many of the songs, the album draws influences from American music like sixties pop music in "Placer Hollywood", folk rock in "Good Boy" and country/blues in "A Crying Diamond". It also includes songs in English like "Good Boy", "A Crying Diamond" and "Beautiful Sadness".

It deals with themes of love, change and maternity, being an "autobiographic" album, the song "Supermercado" ("Supermarket") was inspired in an argument that Laferte had with her partner in a supermarket while the songs "Algo es Mejor" ("Something is Better") and "Niña" ("Girl") deal with her longing to become a mother, both songs were written before she was pregnant, the former song was conceived while Laferte was driving through Malibu and thought for her desires to become pregnant. The song "A Crying Diamond" deals with the experience of abuse Laferte suffered when she was a teenager, according to her, the hormones she was taking allowed her to write about more intimate topics, she said that "it's something that I think I would never have dared to make a song or tell about, but I was so hypersensitive that I wrote that song".

Promotion
The song "Algo es Mejor" was released as a single on October 1, 2021, alongside a music video. On June 9, 2022, a music video for "Supermercado", directed by Camila Grandi, was also released to promote the album. Additionally, several live performance videos were released for different songs from the album like "A Crying Diamond", which featured backing vocals and instrumentation from musicians Renee, arroba nat, Bratty and Cancamusa.

Critical reception

Thom Jurek from AllMusic gave the album four out of five stars, writing that "it reflects Laferte's particular gifts as a songwriter capable of juxtaposing conflicting, even contradictory emotions and psychological states as well as imbuing physical landscapes and personal interactions, no matter how brief and/or casual, with profound implications", he also commented that "though a 180-degree turn from the Mexican regional music employed on Seis, 1940 Carmen is every bit its equal in creativity, emotional depth, and execution".

Rodrigo Derbez from Indie Rocks! gave the album a seven out of ten, writing that while it has high points like "Supermercado" and "A Crying Diamond", the album was not as innovative or fresh as Seis, he finished the review with "1940 Carmen is an experience that feels well prepared, much more with a commercial intention than an artistic one, although it doesn't mean that there isn't any heart in this album either, it just feels so clean it's sterile".

Track listing
All tracks were written and produced by Mon Laferte.

References

2021 albums
Mon Laferte albums